Kristan "Kris Fade" Fahd (born 27 February 1980, Sydney, Australia) is an Australian-Lebanese radio presenter, host, and musician.

He is the star of his own breakfast radio show called "The Kris Fade Show" which airs on 104.4 Virgin Radio Dubai and the KIIS Network in Australia. Fade is also a cast member on the reality television show, Dubai Bling (2022), the first such show based out of Dubai.

Career
Fade began his radio career at Sydney's The Edge 96.ONE driving around the street team's car and setting up for local promotions.

Fade has won awards for 'Best Radio DJ', 'Best Personality' and is on the Ahlan! list for the 'Hot 100 Legends.' Fade has performed at various concerts and events including Dubai Music Week and RedfestDXB.

Personal life
Fade's parents George and Gilda Fahd are both from Lebanon and have lived in Australia prior to having children.

Fade is married to Brianna Ramirez Fade. They had a public wedding that was shown on the Netflix reality show, Dubai Bling.
Fade has two children.

His brother Matty Fahd is featured on the Australian version of the British observational reality show Gogglebox, which airs on Foxtel and Network 10.

References

1980 births
Living people
Radio presenters